USS Carl R. Gray (No. 2671) -- later renamed USS Nausett (YT 35) -- was a tugboat, purchased by the U.S. Navy and commissioned on 5 October 1918, Boatswain J. Zucker .

East Coast Service 

She was placed in commission as USS Carl R. Gray (ID # 2671) for service as a harbor tugboat with the Fifth Naval District.

In August 1919 she was transferred to the Fourth Naval District and on 24 November 1920 she was renamed and redesignated, becoming Nausett (YT-35). For the rest of her Naval career the tug served in the vicinity of the Philadelphia Navy Yard, Pennsylvania.

Decommissioned

On 28 February 1933 she was decommissioned. She was stricken from the Navy Register on 13 March 1933 and sold.

References

External links 
 USS Carl R. Gray 
 USS Carl R. Gray (ID 2671)

Tugs of the United States Navy
1918 ships
World War I auxiliary ships of the United States
Ships built in Baltimore